Anglo-Afghan Treaty of 1855 in Peshawar
 Anglo-Afghan Treaty of 1879 in Gandamak
 Anglo-Afghan Treaty of 1893 in Kabul
 Anglo-Afghan Treaty of 1919 in Rawalpindi